Local elections took place in much of the United Kingdom on 6 May 1999. All Scottish and Welsh unitary authorities had all their seats elected. In England a third of the seats on each of the Metropolitan Boroughs were elected along with elections in many of the unitary authorities and district councils.  There were no local elections in Northern Ireland.

The elections saw Labour, now in their second year of government, suffer a setback as the opposition Conservatives gained ground. The councils up for election had last been contested in 1995, which saw Labour achieve record gains and the Conservatives lose over 2,000 seats.

Summary of results

England

Metropolitan boroughs
All 36 English Metropolitan borough councils had one third of their seats up for election.

Unitary authorities

Whole council

‡ New ward boundaries

Third of council

District councils

Whole council

‡ New ward boundaries

Third of council

Scotland

Wales

References

Vote 1999 BBC News
The local elections of 6 May 1999. House of Commons Library Research Paper 99/52.

 
1999
Local
May 1999 events in the United Kingdom